Anagnosti is a surname. Notable people with the surname include: 

Dhimitër Anagnosti (born 1936), Albanian film director
Roza Anagnosti (born 1943), Albanian actress